The 2020 Laurence Olivier Awards was held on 25 October 2020 at the London Palladium and hosted by Jason Manford, who presented all of the awards except Special Recognition.

The Oliviers were originally scheduled to be held on 5 April 2020 at the Royal Albert Hall with Manford as host, but was cancelled on 17 March due to the COVID-19 pandemic in the United Kingdom.

Event calendar 
12 January: Jason Manford announced as host
14 February: Jo Hawes, Thelma Holt, Stephen Jameson, Sarah Preece and Peter Roberts are announced as the recipients of the Special Recognition Award
3 March: Nominations announced
6 March: Don Black is announced as a recipient of the Special Award
17 March: Award ceremony cancelled
5 April: Award ceremony originally scheduled
28 September: Award ceremony rescheduled
21 October: Ian McKellen is announced as a recipient of the Special Award
25 October: Award ceremony aired

Eligibility 
Any new production that opened between 20 February 2019 and 18 February 2020 in a theatre represented in membership of Society of London Theatre is eligible for consideration, provided it ran for the minimum amount of performances required for that category. The below are all productions eligible for the main theatre categories.

& Juliet – Shaftesbury Theatre
A Very Expensive Poison – Old Vic
Admissions – Trafalgar Studios 1
All My Sons – Old Vic
Amélie – Other Palace
Anna – National Theatre Dorfman
The Antipodes – National Theatre Dorfman
Appropriate – Donmar Warehouse
As You Like It – Barbican Theatre
Be More Chill – Other Palace
Betrayal – Harold Pinter Theatre
Big – Dominion Theatre
Bitter Wheat – Garrick Theatre
Blank – Donmar Warehouse
Blood Wedding – Young Vic
Botticelli in the Fire – Hampstead Theatre
Captain Corelli's Mandolin – Harold Pinter Theatre
Curtains – Wyndham's Theatre
Cyrano de Bergerac – Playhouse Theatre
A Day in the Death of Joe Egg – Trafalgar Studios 1
Dear Evan Hansen – Noël Coward Theatre
Death of a Salesman – Young Vic and Piccadilly Theatre
Death of England – National Theatre Dorfman
The Doctor – Almeida Theatre
Downstate – National Theatre Dorfman
The Duchess of Malfi – Almeida Theatre
Education, Education, Education – Trafalgar Studios 1
Emilia – Vaudeville Theatre
The End of History – Jerwood Downstairs, Royal Court
Endgame and Rough for Theatre II – Old Vic
Equus – Trafalgar Studios 1
Europe – Donmar Warehouse
Evita – Regent's Park Open Air Theatre
Fairview – Young Vic
Faith, Hope and Charity – National Theatre Dorfman
Falsettos – Other Palace
Fame – Peacock Theatre
Far Away – Donmar Warehouse
Fiddler on the Roof – Playhouse Theatre
Fleabag – Wyndham's Theatre
The Girl on the Train – Duke of York's Theatre
Goldilocks and the Three Bears – London Palladium
Groan Ups – Vaudeville Theatre
Hansard – National Theatre Lyttelton
The Haystack – Hampstead Theatre
The Henriad: Henry IV (parts 1) and 2) and Henry V – Globe
The Hunt – Almeida Theatre
The Illusionists – Shaftesbury Theatre
Jesus Hopped the 'A' Train – Young Vic
Joseph and the Amazing Technicolor Dreamcoat – London Palladium
Jude – Hampstead Theatre
A Kind of People – Jerwood Downstairs, Royal Court
The King of Hell's Palace – Hampstead Theatre
Kunene and the King – Ambassadors Theatre
Leopoldstadt – Wyndham's Theatre
Lungs – Old Vic
Magic Goes Wrong – Vaudeville Theatre
The Man in the White Suit – Wyndham's Theatre
Mary Poppins – Prince Edward Theatre
Master Harold and the Boys – National Theatre Lyttelton
Measure for Measure – Barbican Theatre
The Merry Wives of Windsor – Globe
A Midsummer Night's Dream – Globe
A Midsummer Night's Dream – Regent's Park Open Air Theatre
My Brilliant Friend – National Theatre Olivier
The Night of the Iguana – Noël Coward Theatre
Noises Off – Garrick Theatre
Nora: A Doll's House – Young Vic
The Ocean at the End of the Lane – National Theatre Dorfman
On Bear Ridge – Jerwood Downstairs, Royal Court
On Your Feet – London Coliseum
Peter Gynt – National Theatre Olivier
The Phlebotomist – Hampstead Theatre
Present Laughter – Old Vic
Ravens: Spassky vs. Fischer – Hampstead Theatre
Richard II – Sam Wanamaker Playhouse
Richard III – Sam Wanamaker Playhouse
Rosmersholm – Duke of York's Theatre
Rutherford and Son – National Theatre Lyttelton
The Secret Diary of Adrian Mole, Aged 13¾ – Ambassadors Theatre
Small Island – National Theatre Olivier
The Son – Duke of York's Theatre
The Starry Messenger – Wyndham's Theatre
Sweet Charity – Donmar Warehouse
Swive (Elizabeth) – Sam Wanamaker Playhouse
The Taming of the Shrew – Barbican Theatre
The Taming of the Shrew – Sam Wanamaker Playhouse
Tartuffe – National Theatre Lyttelton
Teenage Dick – Donmar Warehouse
This Is Going to Hurt – Garrick Theatre
Three Sisters – Almeida Theatre
Three Sisters – National Theatre Lyttelton
Toast – Other Palace
Top Girls – National Theatre Lyttelton
Touching the Void – Duke of York's Theatre
Translations – National Theatre Olivier
Tree – Young Vic
Uncle Vanya – Harold Pinter Theatre
The Upstart Crow – Gielgud Theatre
Vassa – Almeida Theatre
The Visit – National Theatre Olivier
Waitress – Adelphi Theatre
The Wedding Singer – Troubadour Wembley Park Theatre
The Welkin – National Theatre Lyttelton
White Christmas – Dominion Theatre
White Pearl – Jerwood Downstairs, Royal Court

Winners and nominees
The nominations were announced on 3 March 2020 in 26 categories. The winners were announced during the ceremony.

Productions with multiple wins and nominations

Multiple wins 
The following 7 productions received multiple awards:

3: & Juliet, Dear Evan Hansen, Emilia
2: Death of a Salesman, Leopoldstadt, Mary Poppins, Present Laughter

Multiple nominations
The following 19 productions and 2 operas received multiple nominations:

9: & Juliet
8: Fiddler on the Roof
7: Dear Evan Hansen
6: Mary Poppins
5: Cyrano de Bergerac, Death of a Salesman, Rosmersholm
4: Present Laughter, Uncle Vanya
3: Amélie, Emilia
2: A Very Expensive Poison, Berenice, The Doctor, Evita, Fleabag, Joseph and the Amazing Technicolor Dreamcoat, Leopoldstadt, Noye's Fludde, The Ocean at the End of the Lane, Waitress

See also
74th Tony Awards - equivalent awards for Broadway theatre productions

References

External links
Olivier Awards official website

Laurence Olivier Awards
Laurence Olivier Awards
Laurence Olivier Awards ceremonies
Laurence Olivier Awards 2020
October 2020 events in the United Kingdom
2020 in London